Italo disco (variously capitalized, and sometimes hyphenated as Italo-disco) is a music genre which originated in Italy in the late 1970s and was mainly produced in the early 1980s. Italo disco evolved from the then-current underground dance, pop, and electronic music, both domestic and foreign (American hi-NRG, French Euro disco) and developed into a diverse genre. The genre employs electronic drums, drum machines, synthesizers, and occasionally vocoders. It is usually sung in English, and to a lesser extent in Italian and Spanish.

The origin of the genre's name is strongly tied to marketing efforts of the ZYX record label, which began licensing and marketing the music outside Italy in 1982. Italo disco faded in the early 1990s and then split into many genres (Eurobeat, Italo house, Italo dance).

Terminology
The term "Italo", a generic prefix meaning Italian, had been used on pop music compilation albums in Germany as early as 1978, such as Italo Top Hits on the K-Tel label and the first volume of Italo Super Hits on the Ariola label.

There is no documentation of where the term "Italo-Disco" first appeared, but its origins are generally traced to Italian and other European disco recordings released in the German market. Examples include the phrase "Original Italo-Disco" on the sleeve of the German edition of "Girls on Me" by Amin-Peck in 1982, and the 1983 compilation album The Best of Italo-Disco. These records, along with the Italo Boot Mix megamix, were released by Bernhard Mikulski on his ZYX label, who was therefore credited with coining the term "Italo disco". The Best of and Boot Mix compilations each became a 16-volume series that culminated in 1991. Both series primarily featured disco music of Italian origin, often licensed from independent Italian labels which had limited distribution outside Italy, as well as songs in a similar style by other European artists.

The presenters of the Italian music show Discoring (produced by RAI) usually referred to Italo disco tracks as "rock elettronico" (electronic rock) or "balli da discoteca" (disco dance) before the term "Italo disco" came into existence.

History

Origins: 1977–1990

Italo disco originated in Europe in the late 1970s. After Disco Demolition Night in 1979, American interest in disco sharply declined, whereas in Europe the genre maintained mainstream popularity and survived into the 1980s.

The adoption of synthesizers and other electronic instruments by disco artists led to electronic dance music, which spawned many subgenres such as hi-NRG in America and space disco in Europe. Italo disco's influences include Italian producer Giorgio Moroder, French musician Didier Marouani, French drummer Cerrone, and the San Francisco-based hi-NRG producer Patrick Cowley, who worked with singers as Sylvester and Paul Parker.

In the late 1970s, Italo disco group D. D. Sound (La Bionda) released the song "1, 2, 3, 4, Gimme Some More". In 1979, Jacques Fred Petrus and Mauro Malavasi created the soulful post-disco groups Change and B. B. & Q. Band. In 1981, both groups gained US R&B and Dance hits with "Paradise" and "On the Beat" respectively.

Italo disco often features electronic sounds, electronic drums, drum machines, catchy melodies, vocoders, overdubs, and heavily accented English lyrics. By 1983, Italo disco's instrumentation was predominantly electronic. Along with love, Italo disco themes deal with robots and space, sometimes combining all three in songs like "Robot Is Systematic" (1982) by Lectric Workers and "Spacer Woman" (1983) by Charlie.In 1983, there were frequent hit singles, and labels such as American Disco, Crash, Merak, Sensation and X-Energy appeared. The popular label Discomagic Records released more than thirty singles within the year. It was also the year that the term "Italo disco" became widely known outside Italy, with the release of the first volumes of The Best of Italo Disco compilation series on the German record label ZYX. After 1983, Italo disco was also produced outside Italy.

Although Italo disco was successful in mainland Europe during the 1980s, only few singles reached the UK charts, such as Ryan Paris's "Dolce Vita", Laura Branigan's "Self Control", Baltimora's "Tarzan Boy", Spagna's "Call Me" and Sabrina's "Boys", all of which were top 5 hits. Italo disco maintained an influence in the UK's underground music scenes in the UK, and its impact can be heard in the music of several British electronic acts such as the Pet Shop Boys, Erasure and New Order.

Derivative styles

Canada, particularly Quebec, produced several remarkable Italo disco acts, including Trans X ("Living on Video"), Lime ("Angel Eyes"), Rational Youth ("City of Night"), Pluton & the Humanoids ("World Invaders"), Purple Flash Orchestra ("We Can Make It"), and Tapps ("Forbidden Lover"). Those productions were called "Canadian disco" during 1980–1984 in Europe and hi-NRG disco in the U.S.

In English-speaking countries, it was called Italo disco and hi-NRG. In Mexico the style is known just as "disco", having nothing to do with the 1970s genre. German productions were sung in English and were characterized by an emphasis on melody, exaggerated production, and a more earnest approach to the themes of love; examples may be found in the works of Modern Talking, Fancy, American-born singer and Fancy protégé Grant Miller, Bad Boys Blue, Joy, Silent Circle, the Twins, Lian Ross, C. C. Catch, Blue System and London Boys.

During the mid-1980s, spacesynth, a derivation of Italo disco, developed. It was mostly instrumental, featured space sounds, and was exemplified by musicians such as Koto, Proxyon, Rofo, Cyber People, Hipnosis, Laserdance and Mike Mareen (whose music inhabited the spacesynth/hi-NRG overlap).

Eurobeat

As Italo disco declined in Europe, Italian and German producers adapted the sound to Japanese tastes, creating "Eurobeat". Music produced in this style is sold exclusively in Japan due to the country's Para Para culture, produced by Italian producers for the Japanese market. The two most famous Eurobeat labels are A-Beat-C Records and Time Records. One traditional Italo disco label, S.A.I.F.A.M., still produces Eurobeat music for Japan.

Around 1989 in Italy, Italo disco evolved into Italo house when Italian Italo disco artists experimented with harder beats and the "house" sound.

Revival: 1998–present

A big comeback of German disco began in 1998, when Modern Talking reunited. Rete 4 channel in Italy, Hits 24, Goldstar TV, and ProSieben channels in Germany, and the program Nostalgia on Spain's TVE channel started to broadcast Italo disco.

Several online radio stations, like Radio Stad Den Haag (Netherlands), stream the genre. The renewed popularity inspired re-releases and new mixes by many of the original Italo disco record labels. ZYX Records has released many new CD mixes since 2000. Panama Records and Radius Records have re-released Italo tracks on vinyl. Northern European labels I Venti d'Azzurro (Netherlands) and Flashback Records (Finland) have produced unreleased demos, new versions of old hits, and new songs.

A number of new Italo disco artists have emerged and have been featured on the ZYX Italo Disco New Generation discs: Birizdo I Am, Boris Zhivago, D-White, Estimado, Italove, Mirko Hirsch, Nation in Blue, Siberian Heat, among many others.

Italo disco is also one of the major influences to the sound of the synthwave genre. Synthwave and Italo disco revival artists are often featured on the same mixtapes, playlists, and labels.

Related styles and legacy

Space disco

At least one modern history of "space disco" traces the genre's origins to science fiction themes (outer space, robots, and the future) in the titles, lyrics and cover artwork of dance music in the late 1970s. Plausible associations are drawn between the popularity of Star Wars (released mid-1977), the subsequent surge of interest in science fiction themes in popular culture, and the release of a number of science fiction themed and "futuristic"-sounding (synthesizer and arpeggiator-infused) disco music worldwide. The most commercially successful space disco tracks were "Star Wars Theme/Cantina Band" (1977) by Meco, and "Automatic Lover" (1978) by Dee D. Jackson, with each song reaching the top ten in a number of countries, including the United Kingdom.
Additional examples of space disco usually include the compositions "Just Blue" and "Symphony" (both 1978) of French band Space, the same for the track Magic Fly; additional tracks by Dee D. Jackson during the 1970s and 1980s, and "I Feel Space" by Lindstrøm.

Labels producing this type of music include
 Whatever We Want Records  (Brooklyn, NY, USA)
 Feedelity (run by Lindstrøm) (Europe)
 Eskimo , Bear Entertainment/Bear Funk, Prins Thomas' Full Pupp (Belgium)
 Tirk (UK) and D. C. Recordings (UK).

Post-disco and house music
New York City-based post-disco record label Emergency Records specialized in reissuing/selling records from Italy (e.g. Kano "I'm Ready"), since the 1970s. Kano is noted for incorporating American musical elements ("heavy funk" influences, "breakbeat" rhythm, the use of vocoder) with electronic music while using rudimentary synthesizers, constituting one of the earliest forms of Italo disco. This form of Americanized Italo disco, that also includes Klein + M.B.O. ("Dirty Talk", "Wonderful", "The M. B. O. Theme"), re-entered the States and was known to be influential on the development of house music. Doctor's Cat ("Feel the Drive"), likewise, was one of the earliest "house music" songs.

Record labels include
 Emergency Records (NYC, US; 1980s)

See also
 List of Italo disco artists and songs
 List of Euro disco artists
 Disco polo

References

Bibliography
 Peterink, Jeroen (2012). I Venti D'Azzurro presents The History of Italo Disco. 
 
 Catalda Verrina, Francesco (2015). The History Of Italo Disco
 Todesco, Raff (2020). ITALO DISCO: History of Dance Music in Italy from 1975 to 1988
 Halve, Michael (2022). Crazy About Italo

External links
 Eurodance Magazine  - music blog about Eurodance and Italo disco
 Club Disco
 The World of Italo Disco interviews
 Scene and heard: Italo-disco The Guardian
 Italo artists' real names
 Italo song lyrics

 
20th-century music genres
Disco
Disco music genres
1980s in music
Italian styles of music